The 2002 Speedway World Cup (SWC) was the 2nd FIM Speedway World Cup season. The Final took place on 10 August 2002 in Peterborough, Great Britain. The tournament was won by Australia (64 points) and they beat Denmark (58 pts), Sweden (54 pts), Poland (48 pts) and Czech Republic (36 pts) in the Final.

Qualification

 Qualifying round
 2002-05-20
  Abensberg, Motorstadion

Venues
Four cities were selected to host SWC finals events:

Tournament

Qualifying rounds

Race-off

 Race-Off
 2002-08-08
  Peterborough, East of England Showground
 only 22 heats

Final

 The Final
 2002-08-10
  Peterborough, East of England Showground

Final classification

See also
2002 Speedway Grand Prix

References

External links
 www.speedwayworld.tv - World Cup webside

 
2002
World T